Sujata Madhok is an Indian activist and developmental journalist specializing in women's issues. She started her career at the Democratic World Weekly. She also worked for the Youth Times,  the Children's Book Trust, and The Statesman. She then moved on to the Hindustan Times.

Early life and education
Educated at Convent of Jesus and Mary, New Delhi  and Miranda House (Delhi University),

Career
From 1989 to 2000, she was editor of Women's Feature Service, an international organization/ UNESCO umbrella project that produces "features and opinions on development from the gender perspective." She currently writes a column for the Sahara Time, an English language weekly published from New Delhi. She has been active in the women's movement and has worked with women's groups across the country. Her report, "A Situational Analysis of Women and Girls in the National Capital Territory of Delhi" was published by the National Commission for Women (2005).

She has served as secretary of the Delhi Union of Journalists in 2008, in 2009 she served as the treasurer and secretary, and in 2010 she went on to become the first woman president of the Delhi Union of Journalists.

Personal life
Madhok lives and works in Delhi. She has two daughters

Some articles available online
Gender Bias, Infanticide Bane of Indian Women
India: Who Reads Editorials Anyway?
Profiling women, health and development

Other references
Report by Sujata Madhok on Status of Women Workers in the Construction Industry
Book on Rural Development Issues, including a chapter by Madhok
An Article titled "A vast majority lives in abject poverty Gender bias, infanticide bane of Indian woman"

Comments on the topic "Globalization & The Women's Movement In India"

Indian women journalists
Indian women's rights activists
Living people
Writers from Delhi
Delhi University alumni
Indian activist journalists
Year of birth missing (living people)